The Mineral  News and Tribune is an American newspaper published in Keyser, West Virginia. It is owned by WV News as of 2022.

The News Tribune publishes 4 days a week - Tuesday, Thursday, Friday, and Saturday.

It is the newspaper of record for "Mineral County and the Potomac Highlands", in the Cumberland metropolitan area.

It took its name after the 1928 merger of the Mineral Daily News and the Keyser Tribune.  The Daily News was founded in Keyser in 1912; the other paper had begun as the West Virginia Tribune, published in New Creek, West Virginia, in 1870.

References

External links
 www.newstribune.info

Gannett publications
Newspapers published in West Virginia
Cumberland, MD-WV MSA
Mineral County, West Virginia
Newspapers established in 1912
1912 establishments in West Virginia